Cheek is an English and (after 1600 ) American family name.

People with this name include:

 Alison Cheek (born 1927), Australian priest, one of the first women ordained in the Episcopal Church
 Bob Cheek (born 1944), Australian politician
 Chris Cheek (born 1968), American jazz saxophonist
 Cordie Cheek (1916–1933), falsely accused African-American lynching victim
 Curtis Cheek (born 1958), American bridge player and aerospace engineer
 Davis Cheek (born 1999), American football player
 James E. Cheek (1932–2010), President of Howard University
 James Richard Cheek (1936–2011), American diplomat
 Jan Cheek (born 1948), Falkland Islands politician
 Joel Owsley Cheek (1852–1935), creator of Maxwell House coffee
 Joey Cheek (born 1979), American former speed skater, world and Olympic champion
 John Cheek (1855–1942), Australian politician
 John Cheke or Cheek (1514–1557), English Greek scholar and politician, tutor to the future King Edward VI
 King Virgil Cheek (born 1937), former President of Shaw University and Morgan State University
 Louis Cheek (born 1964), American former National Football League player
 Marion Case Cheek (1888–1969), US Navy rear admiral
 Martin Cheek (born 1960), English botanist and taxonomist
 Rick Cheek (born 1977), American kickboxer and mixed martial artist
 Ruben Loftus-Cheek (born 1996), English football player
 Thomas Cheek (died 1659), English politician
 Thomas Cheek (Australian politician) (1894–1994) 
 Tom Cheek (1939–2005), American sportscaster
 Trevien Anthonie Cheek, American drag queen known as Heidi N Closer

See also 

 List of Old English (Anglo-Saxon) surnames

References